Within These Walls is a British television drama programme made by London Weekend Television for ITV and shown between 1974 and 1978.  It portrayed life in HMP Stone Park, a fictional women's prison. Unlike later women-in-prison TV series, Bad Girls (ITV, 1999–2006), and Australian series, Prisoner (aka Prisoner: Cell Block H, Grundy Organisation, original run: 1979–1986), and Wentworth (2013–2021), Within These Walls tended to centre its story-lines around the prison staff rather than the inmates.

The lead character was played by British film actor Googie Withers who played the well-groomed, genteel governor Faye Boswell and episodes revolved around her attempts to liberalise the prison regime while managing her personal life at home.  
 
Another prominent character was her Chief Officer, Mrs. Armitage (Mona Bruce).  
 
Googie Withers left after three series; in Series Four her character was replaced as governor by Helen Forrester (Katharine Blake), who in turn left to be replaced in the final Series Five by Susan Marshall (Sarah Lawson).

Creator and screenwriter of the programme, David Butler, appeared in some episodes as prison chaplain, Rev. Henry Prentice

DVD release
As of November 2011, Network have released all five series on DVD in the UK, with the exception of "Nowhere for the Kids", an episode from Series Two which appears to be missing from the archives.

Screening
The programme was broadcast around 9:00 p.m. (although exact times varied around the ITV regions), but prisoners were locked in their cells 30 minutes before 9:00pm.

Cast
 Googie Withers as Prison Governor - Faye Boswell
 Katharine Blake as Prison Governor - Helen Forrester
 Sarah Lawson as Prison Governor - Sarah Marshall
 Mona Bruce as Chief Officer Mrs. Armitage
 Jerome Willis as Prison Deputy Governor Charles Radley
 Denys Hawthorne as Dr. Peter Mayes
 Beth Harris as Miss Clarke
 Elaine Wells as Principal Prison Officer Spencer
 Sonia Graham as Assistant Governor Martha Parrish
 Miranda Forbes as Prison Officer Parsons
 Janet Lees Price as Assistant Governor Janet Harker

Successful alumnae from the series included Helen Worth, later widely known for her role of Gail Platt on Coronation Street. Worth appeared in an episode of season 1 alongside Cheryl Murray. The two would be reunited as flatmates in Coronation Street in 1977, when Murray joined the cast as Suzie Birchall. Shirley Cheriton and Anna Wing both appeared in the season 2 episode "Skivers", long before becoming original cast members of EastEnders together.

Episodes

Series overview

Series 1 (1974)

Series 2 (1975)

Series 3 (1975)

Series 4 (1976)

Series 5 (1978)

The Lost episode
Episode three from series 2, "Nowhere for the Kids", no longer exists in any format, but its script is included in PDF format on Series Two, Disc One.  The script is located in the root directory of the DVD and is called "Within These Walls-N#149129.pdf"  The script lists St. John's Waterloo church as the rehearsal hall for read-through for the shows.

Despite indications that this episode is unofficially available on the video-sharing website YouTube, this is not the case. 'The Slap' (series 2 episode 4) is incorrectly labelled ‘Nowhere For The Kids' on YouTube.

References

External links

English-language television shows
1970s British drama television series
1974 British television series debuts
1978 British television series endings
British prison television series
1970s British LGBT-related television series
Lesbian-related television shows
Imprisonment and detention of women
ITV television dramas
London Weekend Television shows
Television series by ITV Studios